The French Sign Language Academy, abbreviated ALSF, is a French association to promote French Sign Language (FSL). It was founded in 1979 by Guy Bouchauveau and Christian Bourgeois, the first president. It offers training in FSL and participates in research of the language in partnership with the International Visual Theater.

French Sign Language
Organizations established in 1979
1979 establishments in France